William Mark Wainwright (born 15 December 1956), known professionally as William Orbit, is an English musician and record producer who has sold 200 million recordings worldwide of his own work, his production and song-writing work. He is a recipient of multiple Grammy Awards, Ivor Novello Awards and other music industry awards.

Early life
Orbit (Wainwright) was raised in Palmers Green, a suburb of London. His parents were both schoolteachers; he was the elder of two sons. He left school at the age of 16, and subsisted for a number of years in various low-paying jobs, while seeking an outlet for his creativity. Around this time, while rooming with a friend who was trying to start a recording studio, Orbit found his musical calling.

Torch Song and Bassomatic
In 1980, Orbit teamed up with electronic musician Laurie Mayer and Grant Gilbert to form the electronic/synth group Torch Song. They initially self-released recordings in an audio cassette series, generated from their home-built studio in a squatted anarchist centre, the Centro Iberico in Notting Hill Gate, in London, alongside the Grand Union Canal. Richard Law, who was A&R for IRS Records, was a follower of their music and aesthetic, and in 1981 took it to industry mogul Miles Copeland, who had discovered and managed the Police and the Bangles. When Copeland signed them to the label the deal enabled them to build their ideal studio. There they recorded two albums and four singles, the most successful being the dance chart hit "Prepare to Energize", which was featured in the film Bachelor Party. Orbit and Mayer also composed the soundtrack to the ice hockey movie Youngblood, starring Rob Lowe and Patrick Swayze, and recorded "White Night", written by colleague Rico Conning, which was used in The Texas Chainsaw Massacre 2. The band reunited briefly when Orbit worked with Laurie Mayer and Rico Conning. They released their final album, Toward the Unknown Region in 1995.

This first incarnation of Guerilla Studios had a Trident 80B mixing desk and Otari MTR90 MKII 24 track (2 inch tape) multitrack housed in a back garden on the canals of Little Venice in Paddington, and they also ran it as a commercial enterprise.

Bassomatic was another of Orbit's group projects. The band recorded house music in the 1990s.  The band included vocalist Sharon Musgrave and rapper Steve Roberts, also known as MC Inna Onestep amongst others. For the second album, singer Sindy Finn replaced Musgrave on vocals. Both albums were released by Guerilla Studios, founded by Orbit with Laurie Mayer and Grant Gilbert.

Bassomatic's first album was 1990's Set the Controls for the Heart of the Bass, the title track derived from Pink Floyd's "Set the Controls for the Heart of the Sun". This album was re-released in 1997. A subsequent album, Science and Melody, was released in 1991.

Bassomatic's biggest hit single was "Fascinating Rhythm" in 1990, which reached No. 9 on the UK Singles Chart, and performed well on the UK Dance Chart.

Around this time, Orbit's studio chiefly consisted of a pair of Akai S1000 samplers and a Roland Juno-106 synthesiser.

Productions and remixes

Collaborations and productions included Prince, Madonna, Britney Spears, Mel C, Pink, U2, Katie Melua, Ricky Martin, Beth Orton, Sarah McLachlan, Queen, The Joy Formidable, Robbie Williams, All Saints, Kraftwerk, Harry Enfield and Sugababes. When working with Beck, the two of them wrote a song for Pink, "Feel Good Time," which Orbit then produced for the soundtrack for the 2003 film Charlie's Angels: Full Throttle.

He produced the album 13 by Britpop group Blur, in London and Reykjavík, Iceland.

Orbit had created remixes for Madonna previously such as those of "Justify My Love" and "Erotica" but did not meet her personally until 1997. That summer and autumn, they worked together and produced her multi-Grammy/award-winning seventh album Ray of Light. The album took four months to record and it was the longest she ever spent recording an album. It was released on 22 February 1998.

In 2000, Orbit continued working for Madonna on her album Music, recorded at The Hit Factory in New York.

At this time, he also co-wrote and performed with her on the song "Beautiful Stranger". 
In 2011, he worked with a team of writers including  Jean-Baptiste Kouame, Julie Frost and Klas Ahlund and brought their compositions and his production work to contribute to the twelfth studio album by Madonna, MDNA, released on 23 March 2012, by Interscope Records. He co-produced 6 tracks on the album, including "Masterpiece" which won a Golden Globe for Best Original Song in the Miramax film W.E., at the 69th Golden Globe Awards. After the release of the album, Orbit openly expressed in various media sources his dissatisfaction and disappointment with this Madonna project.

In 2018, he worked on "After All", a song by English-Canadian girl group All Saints from their fifth studio album, Testament (2018). Written by group member Shaznay Lewis along with Peter Hutchings and Orbit, whilst produced by the latter, it was released as the album's second single on 26 July 2018.

Classical work
Inspired and encouraged by Rob Dickins, Orbit's first commercial release in the classical sphere was Pieces in a Modern Style. It was originally released in May 1995 on Orbit's N-Gram Recordings label, and then again in 2000 by Warner Music in the UK and Europe, and on Maverick in the U.S. The album reached No 2 in the UK album charts. The first single release from the album was "Barber’s Adagio for Strings", and a dance remix of the track by Dutch DJ Ferry Corsten was hugely successful. The single reached number 4 in the national singles chart. In 2010 he teamed with Rico Conning and Laurie Mayer to make a follow up album, '′Pieces in a Modern Style 2′', which was released as a two-disc set on the Decca label. The album featured German countertenor Andreas Scholl on an interpretation of Henry Purcell's "Dido’s Lament".

In 2007, he took part in Alex Poots’ Manchester International Festival, and composed a symphonic work in nine movements, "Orchestral Suite" which was performed by the BBC Philharmonic Orchestra, augmented by additional harps, pianos and percussion, and with The Manchester Chorale, conducted by Alexander Shelley at Bridgewater Hall.

Live performance/media/DJ work
In the early '90s, Orbit briefly developed a new label which he called N'Gram.  During the N'Gram period, he co-directed a showcase of the label at Queen Elizabeth Hall on London's Southbank. The acts included The Electric Chamber (which performed the Pieces album), Strange Cargo, and Torch Song.

In 2001, he took part in the Stockhausen Electronic Festival at the Barbican Theatre.

In 2013, he took part in the London Electronic Arts Festival.

He participated in the Liberatum International Cultural Festival in Russia, during which he performed DJ sets in Moscow and Novosibirsk, Siberia.

In 2013, Orbit worked with Britney Spears and will.i.am on the album Britney Jean, with fellow songwriters Ana Diaz and Dan Traynor with whom he wrote and produced the track "Alien". 
He was one of the writers and one of the producers on the Chris Brown song "Don't Wake Me Up" which was recorded at Record Plant in LA and for which he received an ASCAP award in 2013.

This was followed by a production of the Queen track "There Must Be More to Life Than This", which featured archive vocals by Freddie Mercury and Michael Jackson.  Orbit went on to produce another Queen song, "Let Me in Your Heart Again".
In 2015, his composition "The Name of the Wave" was used in the Oscar winning documentary Amy directed by Asif Kapadia.

He performed in 2015 in Almaty, Kazakhstan, and at a gala at Banqueting House in London's Whitehall for the charity Together for Short Lives, a group that sponsors and supports children with terminal illnesses and their families.

More recently, Orbit has deejayed at various clubs in London and Ibiza and at Buckingham Palace for Her Majesty The Queen's annual staff and family Christmas party.

Solo discography

Studio albums

A The original 1995 release was credited to the Orbit alias 'The Electric Chamber', but was withdrawn from sale almost immediately. Re-released in 2000 with additional tracks taking the place of un-cleared tracks from the first release.
B CD release has 4 additional tracks which are not available as a digital download
C Released on single CD and double CD including notable remixes, and a digital version with a bonus track
D Available for free download from SoundCloud

Compilations
 The Best of Strange Cargos (1996, I.R.S.) – A compilation from Orbit's first three Strange Cargo albums, highlighted by two versions of "Water From A Vine Leaf", another collaboration with Beth Orton
 Strange Cargo Vol.1–3 (2000, EMI Records) – 3-CD Box Set
 William / Orbit (2002, Universal) – U.S. two-disc publishing CD set to support William Orbit's publishing catalogue

Singles

Ensemble discography

With Bassomatic

With Torch Song

DNV 2012

Production and songwriting credits

Awards and nominations

Awards
 Grammy Award for Best Pop Vocal Album — Ray of Light
 Grammy Award for Best Dance Recording — "Ray of Light"
 Grammy Award for Best Song Written for Visual Media — "Beautiful Stranger"

Nominations
 Golden Globe Award for Best Original Song — "Beautiful Stranger"
 Grammy Award for Album of the Year — Ray of Light
 Grammy Award for Record of the Year — "Ray of Light"
 Grammy Award for Best Pop Instrumental Album — Pieces in a Modern Style
 Grammy Award for Best Pop Collaboration with Vocals — "Feel Good Time"

References

External links
 
 

 
1956 births
Ableton Live users
Decca Records artists
Downtempo musicians
English DJs
English electronic musicians
English male composers
English people of Finnish descent
English people of Italian descent
English record producers
Grammy Award winners
I.R.S. Records artists
Living people
Maverick Records artists
Musicians from London
People from Shoreditch
Progressive house musicians
Sanctuary Records artists
20th-century squatters
Virgin Records artists
Warner Records artists